Ambalahonko is a municipality in Madagascar. It belongs to the district of Ambanja, which is a part of Diana Region. According to 2001 census the population of Ambalahonko was 6,000.

Only primary schooling is available in town. The majority 98% of the population are farmers.  The most important crops are coffee and oranges, while other important agricultural products are cocoa and vanilla.  Services provide employment for 0.5% of the population, while fishing employs 1.5% of the population.

References and notes 

Populated places in Diana Region